Spink Gaelic Athletic Association Club is a gaelic football club in Spink, County Laois, Ireland.

The club colours are green and red and the club is located in the parish of Ballinakill on the main Abbeyleix to Carlow road.

Honours
 Laois Junior Football Championships (3) 1944, 1987, 2011
 Laois Intermediate Football Championship (1) 1989
 Laois Junior B Football Championship (2) 1986, 2004
 Laois All-County Football League Division 2: (2) 1988, 1989
 Laois All-County Football League Division 4: (1) 1986

Notable players
Spink was represented on the Laois Under 21 football team by goalkeeper John Dunphy in 2010 and 2011.

References

External links
 2004 junior title report from Laois Nationalist

Gaelic games clubs in County Laois
Gaelic football clubs in County Laois